The Mixed 50m Free Pistol SH1 shooting event at the 2004 Summer Paralympics was competed  on 23 September. It was won by Andrey Lebedinsky, representing .

Preliminary

23 Sept. 2004, 11:45

Final round

23 Sept. 2004, 15:30

References

X